Yuval Ne'eman (14 May 1925 – 26 April 2006) was an  Israeli theoretical physicist, military scientist, and politician. He was Minister of Science and Development in the 1980s and early 1990s. He was the President of Tel Aviv University from 1971 to 1977. He was awarded the Israel Prize in the field of exact sciences (which he returned in 1992 in protest of the award of the Israel Prize to Emile Habibi), the Albert Einstein Award, the Wigner Medal, and the EMET Prize for Arts, Sciences and Culture.

Biography
Yuval Ne'eman was born in Tel Aviv during the Mandate era, graduated from high school at the age of 15, and studied mechanical engineering at the Technion.

At the age of 15, Ne'eman also joined the Haganah. During the 1948 Arab-Israeli War Ne'eman served in the Israel Defense Forces (IDF) as battalion deputy commander, then as Operations Officer of Tel Aviv, and commander of Givati Brigade.

Later (1952–54) he served as Deputy Commander of Operations Department of General Staff, Commander of the Planning Department of the IDF. In this role, he helped organize the IDF into a reservist-based army, developed the mobilization system, and wrote the first draft of Israel's defense doctrine.

Between 1958 and 1960 Ne'eman was IDF Attaché in Great Britain, where he also studied for a PhD in physics under the supervision of 1979 Nobel Prize in Physics winner Abdus Salam at Imperial College London. In 1961, he was demobilized from the IDF with a rank of colonel.

In 1981, Ne'eman became a founding member of the World Cultural Council.

Between 1998 and 2002 Ne'eman was the head of the Israeli Engineer Association

Scientific career
One of his greatest achievements in physics was his 1961 discovery of the classification of hadrons through the SU(3) flavour symmetry, now named the Eightfold Way, which was also proposed independently by Murray Gell-Mann. This SU(3) symmetry laid the foundation of the quark model, proposed by Gell-Mann and George Zweig in 1964 (independently of each other).

Ne'eman was founder and director of the School of Physics and Astronomy at Tel Aviv University from 1965 to 1972, President of Tel Aviv University from 1971 to 1977 (following George S. Wise, and succeeded by Haim Ben-Shahar), and director of its Sackler Institute of Advanced Studies from 1979 to 1997. He was also the co-director (along with Sudarshan) of the Center for Particle Theory at the University of Texas, Austin from 1968 to 1990. He was a strong believer in the importance of space research and satellites to Israel's economic future and security, and thus founded the Israel Space Agency in 1983, which he chaired almost until his death. He also served on the Israel Atomic Energy Commission from 1965 to 1984 and held the position of scientific director in its Soreq facility. Nee'man was chief scientist of the Defense Ministry from 1974 to 1976.

He was described as "one of the most colorful figures of modern science" and co-authored The Particle Hunters, which was published in English in 1986. The Times Literary Supplement hailed this book as "the best guide to quantum physics at present available".

Awards and honours
In 1969, Ne'eman received the Israel Prize in the field of exact sciences (which he returned in 1992 in protest of the award of the Israel Prize to Emile Habibi).
In 1970, he received the Albert Einstein Award for his unique contribution in the field of physics.
In 1972, he was elected to the National Academy of Sciences.
In 1984, he received the Wigner Medal, which is awarded every 2 years for "outstanding contributions to the understanding of physics through group theory."
In 2003, he received the EMET Prize for Arts, Sciences and Culture for his pioneering contribution in the deciphering of the atomic nucleus and its components, and for his enormous scientific contribution to the development of sub-atomic physics in Israel.

He was also awarded with the College de France Medal and the Officer's Cross of the French Order of Merit (Paris, 1972), the Wigner Medal (Istanbul-Austin, 1982), Birla Science Award (Hyderabad, 1998) and additional prizes and honorary doctorates from universities in Europe and USA.

Political career
In the late 1970s, Ne'eman founded Tehiya, a right-wing breakaway from Likud, formed in opposition to Menachem Begin's support for the Camp David talks that paved the way for peace with Egypt and the evacuation of Yamit. He was elected to the Knesset in the 1981 elections in which Tehiya won three seats. The party joined Begin's coalition about a year after the elections and Ne'eman was appointed Minister of Science and Development, the role later changed to Minister of Science and Technology.

He retained his seat in the 1984 elections, but Tehiya were not included in the grand coalition formed by the Alignment and Likud. After the 1988 elections, Tehiya were again excluded from the governing coalition. Ne'eman resigned from the Knesset on 31 January 1990 and was replaced by Gershon Shafat. However, Tehiya joined the government in June after the Alignment had left, and he was appointed Minister of Energy and Infrastructure and Minister of Science and Technology despite not retaking his seat in the Knesset. He lost his ministerial position following the 1992 elections and did not return to politics.

Death
He died at age 80, on 26 April 2006 in the Ichilov Hospital, Tel Aviv, from a stroke. He left a wife, Dvora; a son and daughter; and a sister, Ruth Ben-Yisrael.

See also
List of Israel Prize recipients

References

External links

 Jerusalem Post obituary
 Yuval Ne'eman's papers in the INSPIRE-HEP database
 Jewish Physicists list

1925 births
2006 deaths
People from Tel Aviv
Jews in Mandatory Palestine
Herzliya Hebrew Gymnasium alumni
Technion – Israel Institute of Technology alumni
Haganah members
Israeli soldiers
Israeli Jews
Presidents of universities in Israel
Jewish scientists
Particle physicists
Israeli physicists
Israeli nuclear physicists
Academic staff of Tel Aviv University
Israel Prize in exact science recipients
Israel Prize in exact science recipients who were physicists
EMET Prize recipients in the Exact Sciences
Members of the Israel Academy of Sciences and Humanities
Foreign associates of the National Academy of Sciences
Tehiya leaders
Founding members of the World Cultural Council
Space program of Israel
Jewish physicists
Jewish Israeli politicians
Members of the 10th Knesset (1981–1984)
Members of the 11th Knesset (1984–1988)
Members of the 12th Knesset (1988–1992)
Fellows of the American Physical Society
Burials at Trumpeldor Cemetery
Leaders of the Opposition (Israel)
Ministers of Energy of Israel
Ministers of Infrastructure of Israel
Ministers of Science of Israel